Ormesporden Hill is a hill at the southwest end of Linnormen Hills in the Payer Mountains of Queen Maud Land. Mapped by  Norwegian cartographers from surveys and air photos by the Norwegian Antarctic Expedition (1956–60) and named Ormesporden (the serpent's tail).

Hills of Queen Maud Land
Princess Astrid Coast